Asclepias perennis, also known as aquatic milkweed or white swamp milkweed (not to be confused with swamp wilkweed; Asclepias incarnata), is a North American species of milkweed that is found throughout the Coastal Plain from eastern Texas to southern South Carolina, northward along the Mississippi River, and into the Ohio Valley of Illinois, Indiana, and Kentucky. There seems to be a few disjunct populations in Arkansas, Texas, and Indiana.

A similar species, Asclepias texana, looks morphologically similar but differs by a very divided distribution (central and western Texas), growing in dry rocky soils, and having more broadly ovate leaves.

Description 
The lateral stems arise from the main stem, and can be many.

Ecology 
Found in low wet woods, cypress swamps, lake and pond margins, slow streams, and wet ditches. Native substrate is typically organic-rich and saturated. It can thrive in partial sun to full sun. This species is secure, and found in 13 states. The Aquatic Milkweed has adapted to disperse seed by water, as the seeds float and lack the comas utilized by other milkweeds to disperse by air. It is a known host plant for the Monarch Butterfly. Blooms May - September.

Cultivation 
The aquatic milkweed is commercially available by both seed and propagated plants. Seed readily germinates, and mature flowering plants can be grown in as little as three to four months. Plants can be successfully grown in containers as small as a quart, and amount of stems increases with size of container. This species thrives with an abundance of water, in which substrate should retain good moisture levels and rarely, if ever, dry out. Cold hardiness has been noted to -23 °C.

References 

perennis